Music for People (MfP) is a non-profit organization dedicated to music-making and music improvisation as a means of self-expression. Their primary activities include organizing workshops for improvisational music, hosting a four-year Musicianship and Leadership Program that provides training in music facilitation, and publishing various resources related to improvisational music.

Music for People was founded in 1986 by cellist David Darling and flautist Bonnie Insull. The core of the teaching methods center on Humanistic education.

Graduates of the Musicianship and Leadership Program facilitate a wide range of music events and programs such as drum circles and flute circles.

Philosophy 
The philosophy of Music for People is encapsulated in a Bill of Musical Rights that centers on the need for musical self-expression, authenticity, and acceptance of the full range of music traditions and the musical contributions of all people, regardless of their level of experience.

The approach to music facilitation is generally unconventional, using a playful teaching style developed by David Darling beginning with his work leading workshops as part of the Paul Winter Consort beginning in 1980. The approach to tonal and rhythmic improvisation has been found to have positive social influences, both similar to and contrasting with clinical music therapy approaches.

One of the core techniques used is ensemble playing, where participants have varying levels of musical experience, come from different genres of music, and often include instruments that typically do not play together.

Darling's dedication to Arts-in-Education innovation and creativity earned him the 1995 Artist of the Year Award from Young Audiences, Inc.

Music for People has prompted many offshoots, such as the Improv Collective at Fredonia University
and the classical music program at DePauw University that incorporates music improvisation.

A Musical Bill of Rights 

This sums up the philosophy promoted by the organization:

 Human beings need to express themselves daily in a way that invites physical and emotional release.
 Musical self-expression is a joyful and healthy means of communication available to absolutely everyone.
 There are as many different ways to make music as there are people. 
 The human voice is the most natural and powerful vehicle for musical self-expression. The differences in our voices add richness and depth to music.
 Sincerely expressed emotion is at the root of meaningful musical expression. 
 Your music is more authentically expressed when your body is involved in your musical expression.
 The European tradition of music is only one sound. All other cultures and traditions deserve equal attention. 
 Any combination of people and instruments can make music together. 
 There are no "unmusical" people, only those with no musical experience. 
 Music improvisation is a unique and positive way to build skills for life-expression. 
 In improvisation as in life, we must be responsible for the vibrations we send one another.

Resources 
The techniques used in music education have been published in a handbook on musical forms and structures,
as well as a set of three CDs of interviews with David Darling and Julie Weber.

There are also supplementary information relating to the Musicianship and Leadership program relating to the development of activities in music workshops.

Music Programs, University Courses, and Workshops by Graduates 
Here are links to some of the music workshops that have been organized and facilitated by graduates of the Musicianship and Leadership program:

 
  Undergraduate course at Adelphi University, Garden City, New York.

References

Further reading

External links 
 Music for People: Official web site
Music for People Europe: Web site for European offers 

Music education organizations